Kwak  Jae-gu is a South Korean modern poet.

Life
Kwak Jaegu was born in Gwangju, Jeollanam-do in 1954. He graduated from Chonnam National University. After his poem  (At Sapyeong Station) won a literary contest sponsored by the JoongAng Ilbo in 1981, Kwak became active in the literary circle that produced the magazine May Poetry. Kwak is currently a professor at Sunchon National University, where he works with Korean author Kim Won-il.

Work
Kwak Jaegu’s poetic legacy derives primarily from the distinctly Korean aesthetic of his depictions of love and loneliness. The development evident from Kwak's first collection of poems, At Sapyeong Station, to his third collection, Korean Lovers, demonstrates a transition from an abstract passion for historical and social issues to a relationship with social reality seen through the prism of unabstracted love. This poetic evolution can also be seen as an ever-deepening search for a true sense of self.

Beginning with his fourth collection of poems, Kwak's poetry embarks upon a search for a concrete realization of love and spiritual rebirth. Kwak's early poetry overflows with anger at the egregious violence of society and a love for the common people who suffer from the brunt of this violence. The emotions at the fore in this poetry (sadness, loneliness, rage, despair, longing, love) demonstrate the extent of the poet's anger and frustration.
 
In Kwak's first collection of poems, these emotions are expressed in vague, abstract terms, they become progressively crystallized and concretely conveyed with each successive collection. The poems in  reveal awareness of history and social conditions and a depiction of the human condition in concrete and lyrical. These poems transcend the basic emotions of anger and sorrow in light of the violence in the world and attempt to restore purity and love.

Awards
JoongAng Ilbo literary contest (1981)
 Dongseo Literature Prize (1997)

Works in Korean (Partial)
Poetry
At Sapyeong Station, 1983
Barrel-Loaded Arirang, 1985
Korean Lovers, 1986
Seoul Senoya, 1990
Very Clear Stream of Water, 1996
I Gave My Heart Before Flowers, 1990
Essay Collections
The Person I Loved, the World I Loved, 1993
Kwas Jae-ju's Journal of Trips to Seaports, 2002

See also
Korean Literature
List of Korean-language poets

External links
Korean Poem – Winter’s Dance by Kwak Jae-gu at Gwangju Blog - https://web.archive.org/web/20140221221755/http://gwangjublog.com/kwak-jae-gu/

References 

1954 births
Korean writers
Living people